Bryan Garcia (born April 19, 1995) is an American professional baseball pitcher in the Houston Astros organization. He has played in Major League Baseball (MLB) for the Detroit Tigers.

Amateur career
Garcia attended Christopher Columbus High School in Miami, Florida, known as the Lawn Mower where he played for the school's baseball team as a starting pitcher. In 2013, as a senior, he had a 8–1 win–loss record with a 1.23 earned run average (ERA). He was not selected in the 2013 MLB draft out of high school and  enrolled at the University of Miami, where he played college baseball for the Miami Hurricanes baseball team. In 2016, working as a relief pitcher, he went 2–0 with a 1.89 ERA in 38 innings, set the Miami career record for saves (18), and won the NCBWA Stopper of the Year Award.

Professional career

Detroit Tigers
The Detroit Tigers selected Garcia in the sixth round, with the 175th overall selection, of the 2016 MLB draft. He signed with the Tigers, and made his professional debut with the Connecticut Tigers of the Class A-Short Season New York-Penn League, and was later promoted to  the West Michigan Whitecaps of the Class A Midwest League; in 18.2 total innings between both teams, he posted an 0–2 record and 2.41 ERA. He began 2017 with West Michigan and earned promotions to the Lakeland Flying Tigers of the Class A-Advanced Florida State League, the Erie SeaWolves of the Class AA Eastern League, and the Toledo Mud Hens of the Class AAA International League. In 52 total games between the four teams, Garcia pitched to a 5–3 record, 2.13 ERA and a 1.05 WHIP.

Garcia tore his ulnar collateral ligament of the elbow in February 2018 and underwent Tommy John surgery on February 15, missing the whole 2018 season. Garcia returned in May 2019, and played for Lakeland, Erie, and Toledo during the 2019 minor league season. He went a combined 3–0 with a 3.05 ERA in 41 innings.

On September 1, 2019, the Tigers selected Garcia's contract and promoted him to the major leagues. He made his major league debut on September 2 versus the Minnesota Twins, pitching a scoreless inning in relief.

Garcia began the 2020 season in the Tigers bullpen. He earned his first major league save on September 6, 2020, against the Minnesota Twins. In the 2020 season, Garcia pitched in 26 games, posting a 1.66 ERA and compiling a 2–1 record with 4 saves and 12 strikeouts in  innings. Garcia was awarded the 2020 Detroit Tigers Rookie of the Year Award by the Detroit Sports Media Association.

Garcia began the 2021 season in the Tigers bullpen once again. He struggled through May 30, and was optioned to Toledo. In 39 major league appearances, Garcia went 3–2 with a 7.55 ERA and 32 strikeouts.

On April 16, 2022, Garcia was designated for assignment by the Tigers. He cleared waivers and the Tigers sent him outright to Toledo. He had his contract selected on July 28, as a covid substitute player. Garcia made 39 appearances for Toledo in 2022, working to a 5–3 record and 3.80 ERA with 69 strikeouts in 85.1 innings of work.

Houston Astros
On February 7, 2023, Garcia signed a minor league contract with the Houston Astros organization.

References

External links

Miami Hurricanes bio

1995 births
Living people
Baseball players from Miami
Major League Baseball pitchers
Detroit Tigers players
Miami Hurricanes baseball players
Connecticut Tigers players
West Michigan Whitecaps players
Lakeland Flying Tigers players
Erie SeaWolves players
Toledo Mud Hens players
Christopher Columbus High School (Miami-Dade County, Florida) alumni